S. Sivaraj is an Indian politician and was a Member of the Legislative Assembly of Tamil Nadu. He was elected to the Tamil Nadu legislative assembly from Rishivandiyam constituency as an Indian National Congress candidate in the 1984 and 2006 elections, and as a Tamil Maanila Congress (Moopanar) candidate in the 1996 and 2001 elections.

References 

Living people
Indian National Congress politicians from Tamil Nadu
Tamil Nadu MLAs 1985–1989
Tamil Nadu MLAs 1996–2001
Tamil Maanila Congress politicians
Tamil Nadu MLAs 2001–2006
Tamil Nadu MLAs 2006–2011
Year of birth missing (living people)